Nachaba reconditana is a species of snout moth in the genus Nachaba. It was described by Francis Walker in 1864, and is known from Brazil.

References

Moths described in 1864
Chrysauginae